Robertson County is a county located on the central northern border of Tennessee in the United States. As of the 2020 United States Census, the population was 72,803 people. Its county seat is Springfield. The county was named for James Robertson, an explorer, founder of Nashville, and a state senator, who was often called the "Father of Middle Tennessee." Robertson County is a component of the Nashville-Davidson–Murfreesboro–Franklin, TN Metropolitan Statistical Area.

History
This was part of the Miro District (also spelled Mero), named after the Spanish Governor Esteban Rodríguez Miró of what was then Louisiana on the west side of the Mississippi River. Miró had served with Spanish troops that assisted the Americans during their war for independence. James Robertson, the explorer for whom this county was named, was trying to create an alliance with Miró that would allow free movement on the Mississippi River (which Spain controlled) to settlers on the Cumberland frontier. Before statehood, this territory was known as Tennessee County.

It was organized as Robertson County in 1796, at the same time as Montgomery County, which had also been part of the Miro district. The county seat, Springfield, Tennessee, was laid out in 1798. Although initially, most settlers did not hold slaves, by the 1820s planters began to cultivate tobacco, a commodity crop that was labor-intensive and depended on enslaved African Americans. The planters bought slaves to work their plantations, as well as to care for the livestock they bred - thoroughbred horses and cattle.

By the time of the Civil War, African Americans comprised about one-quarter of the area's population, typical for Middle Tennessee, where tobacco and hemp were commodity crops. During the Civil War, Tennessee was occupied by the Union from 1862, which led to a breakdown in social organization in Middle Tennessee.

By 1910 the county's population was 25,466, including 6,492 black citizens, who continued to make up one-quarter of the total. Most of the residents were still involved in farm work, and tobacco was the primary commodity crop, but agricultural mechanization was reducing the need for laborers. White conservative Democrats had tried to restrict black voting; other southern states had excluded blacks from the political process. Many African Americans left rural Robertson County and other parts of Tennessee in the Great Migration to northern and midwestern cities for employment and social freedom. Combined with the later in-migration of whites to the county, by the early 21st century, African Americans comprised less than 10 percent of the county population. They live chiefly in its larger towns.

Geography

Adjacent counties
Logan County, Kentucky (north)
Simpson County, Kentucky (northeast)
Sumner County (east)
Davidson County (south)
Cheatham County (southwest)
Montgomery County (west)
Todd County, Kentucky (northwest)

State protected areas
Cedar Hill Swamp Wildlife Management Area
Port Royal State Park (part)

Demographics

2020 census

As of the 2020 United States census, there were 72,803 people, 26,577 households, and 20,378 families residing in the county.

2000 census
As of the census of 2000, there were 54,433 people, 19,906 households, and 15,447 families residing in the county. The population density was 114 people per square mile (44/km2). There were 20,995 housing units at an average density of 44 per square mile (17/km2). The racial makeup of the county was 89.13% White, 8.62% Black or African American, 0.28% Native American, 0.31% Asian, 0.02% Pacific Islander, 0.83% from other races, and 0.80% from two or more races. 2.66% of the population were Hispanic or Latino of any race.

In 2005 the racial makeup of the county was 85.4% non-Hispanic whites, 8.3% African Americans, and 5.3% Latinos.

There were 19,906 households, out of which 37.40% had children under the age of 18 living with them, 61.90% were married couples living together, 11.20% had a female householder with no husband present, and 22.40% were non-families. 18.60% of all households were made up of individuals, and 7.50% had someone living alone who was 65 years of age or older.  The average household size was 2.71 and the average family size was 3.06.
⁹
In the county, the population was spread out, with 26.80% under the age of 18, 8.50% from 18 to 24, 31.40% from 25 to 44, 22.50% from 45 to 64, and 10.80% who were 65 years of age or older. The median age was 35 years. For every 100 females, there were 98.80 males. For every 100 females age 18 and over, there were 95.70 males.

The median income for a household in the county was $43,174, and the median income for a family was $49,412. Males had a median income of $34,895 versus $24,086 for females. The per capita income for the county was $19,054.  About 6.40% of families and 9.00% of the population were below the poverty line, including 10.90% of those under age 18 and 13.10% of those aged 65 or over.

Communities

Cities

Adams
Cedar Hill
Cross Plains
Greenbrier
Millersville (mostly in Sumner County)
Orlinda
Portland (partly in Sumner County)
Ridgetop (partly in Davidson County)
Springfield (county seat)
White House (mostly in Sumner County)

Towns
Coopertown

Hamlets
Calistia
Jernigan Town

Unincorporated communities

Ashburn
Baggettsville
Barren Plains
Crunk
Holmansville
Hubertville
Milldale
Port Royal (partial Montgomery County)
Sandy Springs
Stroudville
Turnersville
Youngville

Transportation
Highways
Interstate Highways
  Interstate 65
  Interstate 24
United States Numbered Highways
  U.S. Route 31W
  U.S. Route 41
  U.S. Route 41 Alternate
  U.S. Route 431
Tennessee State Routes
  Tennessee State Route 11
  Tennessee State Route 25
  Tennessee State Route 41
  Tennessee State Route 49
  Tennessee State Route 52
  Tennessee State Route 65
  /  Tennessee State Route 76
  Tennessee State Route 109
  Tennessee State Route 112
  Tennessee State Route 161
  Tennessee State Route 256
  Tennessee State Route 257
U.S. Routes 41 and 431 run through the county, intersecting and briefly forming a concurrency in Springfield. US 31W forms the eastern border with Sumner County and runs through White House and Cross Plains. Major state routes include 25, 49, 52, 76, and 109. Secondary state routes in Robertson County include 161, 256, and 257.

Politics
Like many other rural southern counties, Robertson County has been historically a Democratic stronghold. Since the 2004 presidential election, however, the county (and the state as a whole) has sped rapidly toward the Republican Party. The last time Robertson County voted for a Democratic candidate in a statewide race was for Phil Bredesen in 2006, and the last time it voted for a Democratic candidate on a presidential level, was in 2000 when it voted for Democrat Al Gore.

See also
National Register of Historic Places listings in Robertson County, Tennessee

References

External links

Official site
Robertson County History in state encyclopedia
Robertson County, Tenn GenWeb - free genealogy resources for the county

Robertson County Chamber of Commerce 
Robertson County Schools

 
Nashville metropolitan area
1796 establishments in Tennessee
Populated places established in 1796
Middle Tennessee